Brooks's dyak fruit bat (Dyacopterus brooksi) is a species of megabat in the family Pteropodidae endemic to Sumatra. It was formerly included as a subspecies of the dayak fruit bat. It is named for Cecil Joslin Brooks, who collected the type specimen near Bencoolen and presented it to Oldfield Thomas.

References

Dyacopterus
Bats of Indonesia
Bat, Brooks's dyak fruit
Bat, Brooks's dyak fruit
Vulnerable fauna of Asia
Mammals described in 1920
Taxa named by Oldfield Thomas